Oslo Met may refer to
The Norwegian Meteorological Institute in Oslo, which is also known under the abbreviation Met Oslo since the early 20th century
Oslo Metropolitan University, which uses the abbreviation OsloMet since 2018